Indonesia competed at the 1992 Summer Olympics in Barcelona, Spain. 42 competitors, 27 men and 15 women, took part in 31 events in 10 sports. They won both Men's and Women's singles as their first gold medal here from badminton that appeared for the first time at the summer Olympics. They made it the first time Indonesia won gold at the Olympics, and also made Indonesia the first Southeast Asian country to win gold. Alan Budikusuma and Susi Susanti, who later married, had the Olympic anthem played on their wedding day.

Medalists 

| width="78%" align="left" valign="top"|  

| width="22%" align="left" valign="top"|

| width="22%" align="left" valign="top"|

| width="22%" align="left" valign="top" |

Competitors 
The following is the list of number of competitors participating in the Games:

Archery 

Only one of the women who had won Indonesia's first Olympic medal returned in 1992.  Two of the three Olympic rookie women did not advance into the elimination round, while the one that did was defeated in her first match.  In the men's competition, Hendra Setijawan advanced to the quarterfinals before being defeated.

Badminton 

Men

Women

Boxing

Canoeing 

Sprint

Qualification Legend: QR = Qualify to Repechages; q = Qualify to semifinal

Cycling 

Two male cyclists represented Indonesia in 1992.

Men's sprint
 Tulus Widodo Kalimanto - (2nd round repechage)

Men's 1 km time trial
 Herry Janto Setiawan - (27th place)

Fencing 

Two male fencers represented Indonesia in 1992.

Men's épée
 Handry Lenzun
 Lucas Zakaria

Judo 

Men's Lightweight 71 kg
 Wahid Yudhi Sulistianto - (22T)

Men's Half-Heavyweight 95 kg
 Hengky Pie - (32T)

Women's Middleweight 66 kg
 Helena Miagian Papilaya - (13T)

Women's Half-Heavyweight 72 kg
 Pujawati Utama - (13T)

Table tennis 

Men's singles
 Anton Suseno - 3 of 4, Group M

Women's singles
 Ling Ling Agustin - 3 of 4, Group E
 Rossy Pratiwi Dipoyanti - 2 of 4, Group I

Women's doubles
 Ling Ling Agustin / Rossy Pratiwi Dipoyanti - 3 of 4, Group H

Tennis

Weightlifting

See also
 1992 Olympic Games
 1992 Paralympic Games
 Indonesia at the Olympics
 Indonesia at the Paralympics

References

External links 
Official Olympic Reports
International Olympic Committee results database

Nations at the 1992 Summer Olympics
1992
1992 in Indonesian sport